Gary Basil Newton (born December 12, 1957) is an American field hockey player. He competed for the U.S. at the 1984 Summer Olympics. His brother Michael was one of his teammates at the Olympics. He was born in British Columbia, Canada.

References

External links
 

1957 births
American male field hockey players
Sportspeople from British Columbia
Canadian emigrants to the United States
Canadian male field hockey players
Field hockey players at the 1984 Summer Olympics
Olympic field hockey players of the United States
Living people